Ivan Vekić  may refer to:

Ivan Vekić (politician), Croatian politician and lawyer
Ivan Vekić (handballer), Croatian handball player